Bonily Khongmen (25 June 1912 – 17 March 2007) was an Indian politician in the Indian National Congress Party. She was elected to the Lok Sabha, lower house of the Parliament of India from the Autonomous District constituency   Assam in 1952. She was a member of the 1st Lok Sabha.She was also the Deputy Speaker in Assam assembly.

Early life and career 
Khongmen was educated at Welsh Mission Girls' High School, Shillong, and Diocesan College, Calcutta. Between 1932 and 1946, she worked in education, as headmistress of Golaghat Girls' School (1932–33), Assamese Girls School, Shillong (1935-1940), and Lady Reid School, Shillong (1940-1946).

Political career 
In 1946, Khongmen participated in the provincial elections to the Assam legislative assembly, contesting and winning the Shillong reserved seat, which was then part of Assam. She was subsequently elected as the Deputy Speaker of the Assembly, the first woman to serve in that position. Khongmen contested the first Lok Sabha election in 1951 from the Autonomous District constituency of Assam.  She won the election with 54% of the vote, defeating Wilson Reade of the KJD who was runner-up with 30% of the votes.

Other career 
After serving as an MP in the first Lok Sabha, Khongmen served as the first female Chairperson of the Assam Public Service Commission.

Personal life 
She played the violin, and took an interest in spinning and weaving clothes, collecting books, gardening, reading, and knitting.

References

External links
 Official Biographical Sketch in Lok Sabha Website
 Kabon Neli (Khongmen) Timungpi: the first woman from Northeast India to be a Member of Parliament (M.P.)

1912 births
2007 deaths
20th-century Indian women politicians
20th-century Indian politicians
India MPs 1952–1957
Deputy Speakers of the Assam Legislative Assembly
Indian National Congress politicians from Assam
Lok Sabha members from Assam
Members of the Assam Legislative Assembly
Women members of the Assam Legislative Assembly
Women members of the Lok Sabha
People from West Jaintia Hills district